Mirko Pavličević (born 17 October 1965) is a retired Croatian football defender.

Club career
While at FC Aarau he played alongside future Chelsea star Roberto di Matteo, Polish playmaker Ryszard Komornicki and Bulgarian ace Petar Aleksandrov in the side that won the Swiss national title in 1992–93 and the club's last major trophy.

International career
He made his debut for Croatia in an April 1994 friendly match away against Slovakia, it remained his sole international appearance.

References

External links
 

1965 births
Living people
Association football defenders
Croatian footballers
Croatia international footballers
NK Osijek players
FC Winterthur players
FC Schaffhausen players
FC Aarau players
Yugoslav First League players
Swiss Challenge League players
Swiss Super League players
Croatian expatriate footballers
Expatriate footballers in Switzerland
Croatian expatriate sportspeople in Switzerland